Lana Z Caplan is an American interdisciplinary artist working with photography, video, film and interactive media installations.

Her works have been described as a "suggestion of worlds colliding" and present an abstract illustration of the deepening "schism between humans and the landscape."  Her work has been exhibited and screened in solo and group exhibitions in cities around the world including Beijing, New York, San Francisco, San Juan, Edinburgh, Mexico City, Philadelphia, Boston, Manitoba, New Delhi, Tel Aviv, Valparaiso, and Barcelona.

Recent exhibitions venues and festival include International Short Film Festival Oberhausen, Anthology Film Archives (New York), Inside Out Art Museum (Beijing, China), Museo Tamayo (Mexico City), the Edinburgh International Film Festival (Edinburgh, Scotland), the Antimatter Film Festival (Victoria, BC), the Crossroads Film Festival (San Francisco), the Black Maria Film Festival (a 65-city touring program) and the Public Art Video Commission for the Massachusetts Cultural Council. Her 2010 film Sospira was scored by Chris Brokaw and Kevin Micka from Animal Hospital.

References

External links
Artist Website

Massachusetts College of Art and Design alumni
Living people
American experimental filmmakers
American video artists
American photographers
American women artists
Interdisciplinary artists
Women experimental filmmakers
Year of birth missing (living people)
American contemporary artists
21st-century American women